Sparganothis lindalinea is a species of moth of the family Tortricidae. It is found in the United States in Alabama, Florida and Mississippi.

References

Moths described in 2012
Sparganothis